Ostrobothnia (East Bothnia) refers to various areas in Finland:
 Ostrobothnia County, province of the Kingdom of Sweden 1634–1775
 Ostrobothnia (historical province), province of the Kingdom of Sweden before 1809
 Ostrobothnia (region), in modern Finland
 Other regions in modern Finland:
 South Ostrobothnia
 Central Ostrobothnia
 North Ostrobothnia

See also
 Bothnia (disambiguation)
 Pohjanmaa (disambiguation)

it:Ostrobotnia